Ma Wan was a Chinese landscape painter, calligrapher, and poet during the Yuan Dynasty (1271–1368). His specific dates of birth and death are not known.

Ma was born in  Jiangning (江宁; present-day Nanjing) and later lived in Songjiang. His courtesy name was Wenbi and his pseudonyms were Ludunsheng (鲁钝生; lit. "Ungainly One") and Guanyuanren (灌园人; lit. "Garden Irrigation Person"). He was taught by Yang Weizhen. Ma's landscape painting followed the style of Huang Gongwang, utilizing a clear and faint touch.

Notes

References
 Ci hai bian ji wei yuan hui. Ci hai. Shanghai: Shanghai ci shu chu ban she, 1979.

Painters from Nanjing
Yuan dynasty landscape painters
Year of death unknown
Writers from Nanjing
Yuan dynasty poets
Year of birth unknown
Poets from Jiangsu